In the 1963 Mediterranean Games, one of the games played was volleyball. Yugoslavia won the men's division .

Medalists

Standings
Men's competition

External links
 Complete 1963 Mediterranean Games Standings

Volleyball at the Mediterranean Games
1963 in volleyball
Sports at the 1963 Mediterranean Games
Mediterranean